A chief engineer, commonly referred to as "ChEng" or "Chief", is the most senior engine officer of an engine department on a ship, typically a merchant ship, and holds overall leadership and the responsibility of that department..Chief engineer's rank is equivalent to the rank of a ship's captain. As a person who holds one of the most senior roles on the ship, they must have excellent communication and leadership skills. They will be expected to regularly work alongside other crew members and external consultants, and most importantly, provide guidance to their team.

To be a chief engineer, an engineer must attain a chief engineer's license appropriate to the tonnage, power rating, and type of ship that they are employed on. A chief engineer is ultimately responsible for all operations and maintenance that has to do with any and all engineering equipment throughout the entire ship, and supervises all other engineering officer and engine ratings within the department.

United States

Job requirements

 A Chief Engineer must be a United States citizen of at least 18 years of age.
 A Chief Engineer must acquire the knowledge of understanding, operating and maintaining the latest technology and equipment used on modern ships.
 A Chief Engineer must have the mental Strength, resolute ambition and the ability to work within a team of others.
 A Chief Engineer must be suitable for federal employment and have at least one year of experience as a First Assistant Engineer
 A Chief Engineer must hold a United States passport in their possession.
 A Chief Engineer must have a United States Coast Guard endorsed license

Job description

 A Chief Engineer must be able to stand watches regularly when the ship is either in the sea or in port. Remain the status of On-Call at all times
 Chief Engineer plans, directs and performs as necessary the activities of the Engineering Department in carrying out its assigned functions and responsibilities
 The Chief Engineer is the head of the crew who oversees and takes responsibilities of the ship's plant operations.
 A Chief Engineer would have to supervise their fellow department personnel while providing job training and guidance to their fellow assistant engineers.
 A Chief Engineer must ensure each assigned task is completed and keep required records, logs and reports
 A Chief Engineer may be sent to any vessel nationwide.
 A Chief Engineer must ensure the mission of the ship can be successfully completed by supervising or personally performing particularly complex or difficult technical work and activities.
 A Chief Engineer must attain the role of a guidance for the rest of the crew and give orders or suggestions when needed.
 A Chief Engineer would receive a various amount of salary depending on the particular job. Salary level ranges from $156,527 to $172,736 in the United States.

Designed courses for potential chief engineers

Courses for potential Chief Engineers are designed by experienced engineers who had spent years in the field of engineering already, "To determine the topics that should be included in the certificate, the team undertook an analysis of existing company training materials that were being used for training their senior level project and systems engineers."

A similar training program for potential Chief Engineers, the Certified Chief Engineer (CCE) Training is also being developed by the National Association of Hotel & Lodging Engineers. The development process of CCE includes gathering the input of various hotel management companies and industry professions. CCE program is designed to provide a curriculum exclusively for hotel engineers and maintenance professionals.

Notable representatives

George Hairston: A US Coast Guard Licensed Chief Engineer, who graduated from State University of New York Maritime College. Hairston had sailed on a United States Naval Ship spearhead.

Patrick K. Brown: A US Coast Guard Licensed Chief Engineer, who was associated with discharging waste oil directly overboard. As a result, Chief Engineer Brown faced up to five years of prison time, a potential fine, and a term of probation up to five years.

Tim Olsen: An U.S Coast Guard Licensed Chief Engineer, who sailed on NOAA Ship Nancy Foster, an oceanographic research vessel that became the first U.S. Government ship to visit Cuba since the reestablishment of diplomatic relations.

See also

Seafarer's professions and ranks

References

External links

Nautical terminology
Marine occupations
Transport occupations